Kiminishiki Toshimasa (born 6 July 1937 as Toshimasa Gomi) is a former sumo wrestler from Kisarazu, Chiba, Japan. He made his professional debut in May 1953, and reached the top division in July 1961. His highest rank was maegashira 3. He left the sumo world upon retirement in May 1968.

Career record
The Kyushu tournament was first held in 1957, and the Nagoya tournament in 1958.

See also
Glossary of sumo terms
List of past sumo wrestlers
List of sumo tournament second division champions

References

1937 births
Living people
People from Kisarazu
Japanese sumo wrestlers
Sumo people from Chiba Prefecture